Semyon Altov (born January 17, 1945) is a Soviet comedy writer. Original name: Semyon Teodorovich Altshuller.

Semyon Altov was born in Sverdlovsk. The same year the family moved to Leningrad, where Semyon Altov spent his whole life.

Awards
2003: Honored Artist of the Russian Federation.

References

External links
   Official website

Jewish Russian writers
Soviet screenwriters
20th-century Russian screenwriters
Male screenwriters
20th-century Russian male writers
Russian humorists
Soviet Jews
Russian Jews
Writers from Saint Petersburg
1945 births
Living people
20th-century pseudonymous writers